Maziarnia  is a village in the administrative district of Gmina Żmudź, within Chełm County, Lublin Voivodeship, in eastern Poland.

It is the birthplace of Polish philosopher Stanisław Brzozowski (1878–1911).

References

Villages in Chełm County